Voo Nocturno is the eleventh studio album by Portuguese singer-songwriter Jorge Palma. It was released on 2 July 2007 by EMI Music Portugal.

Track listing

Personnel 
Musicians

 Jorge Palma – vocals, piano, acoustic guitars
 Marco Nunes – guitars
 Miguel Barros – bass
 André Hollanda – drums, percussion
 Miguel Ferreira – Philicorda
 Flak – guitars
 Gabriel Gomes – accordion 
 Pedro Sotiry – synthesizers
 Pedro Vidal – pedal steel guitar
 Rui Alves – drums
 Paulo Gaspar – clarinet
 João Viana – bugle
 Klaus Nymark – trombone
 Jacinto Santos – tuba
 Sila Oliveira – banjo

Production

 Flak – production, recording (estúdios do Olival)
 Cajó – mixing, recording (Bebop estúdios)
 Emily Lazar – mastering
 Mário Pereira – recording (MB estúdios)
 Ricardo Fonseca – recording assistance (MB estúdios)
 Quim Monte – recording (Namouche estúdios)
 Diogo Tavares – recording (Tcha Tcha Tcha estúdios)
 Alive Vinha – cover art
 Rita Carmo – photography
 Alexandra Afonso – photography
 Jorge Palma – photography
 Sofia Silva – photography
 Marco Madruga – design, photography

Charts

References 

2007 albums
Jorge Palma albums
Portuguese-language albums